Jonkheer Willem van Haren (21 February 1710 – 4 July 1768) was a Dutch nobleman and poet.

Van Haren was born in Leeuwarden.  His best-known work was an epic poem, Friso, created in 1741. His brother, jhr. Onno Zwier van Haren, was also a poet and wrote patriotic verses. Willem van Haren died in Sint-Oedenrode.

References

1710 births
1768 deaths
18th-century Dutch writers
Dutch male poets
Dutch critics
18th-century Dutch diplomats
Dutch nobility
People from Leeuwarden
18th-century Dutch poets
18th-century male writers